Ardee railway station was a railway station which served Ardee in County Louth, Ireland. It was the terminus of a branch which diverged from the Belfast-Dublin line at Dromin Junction.

History
The station was opened by the Great Northern Railway of Ireland in 1896. Ardee lost its passenger services in 1934 but goods traffic continued to flow until the 1970s. The last scheduled service was a special in October 1975, and the line was unused after that time, the goods service officially closed in November 1975. The line was not officially abandoned until 1987, with the rails being 'lifted' shortly after.

Engineer

In 1896 The Great Northern Railway had their own engineering staff working under the Chief Engineer William Hemmingway Mills. The Engineer in charge of the Ardee branch was Joshua H. Hargrave (1860-1924) who lived in Dún Laoghaire (known as Kingstown at the time).

Today
Three small structures within the station site, all of which were built in 1880, are listed as protected structures. These include the former railway station building, a two-storey red brick house (former station masters house) and a locomotive shed. The former railway station building is being used as a commercial premises for a local garage called Mid-Louth Garage, a company that has been operational since 1974.

The trackbed itself had been converted into a pedestrian walkway by the local Tidy Towns committee with financial help from Louth County Council in 2007 and further upgrades occurring in 2014.

References 

Disused railway stations in County Louth
Railway stations opened in 1896
Railway stations closed in 1975
1896 establishments in Ireland
1975 disestablishments in Ireland
Ardee
Railway stations in the Republic of Ireland opened in the 19th century